Eversfield is a surname. Notable people with the surname include:

 John Eversfield ( 1624–1678), English politician
 Edward Eversfield ( 1618– 1676), English courtier and politician
 Eversfield baronets